Dirhinosia unifasciella is a moth of the family Gelechiidae. It is found in central Turkey.

The wingspan is about 14 mm for males and 16 mm for females. The forewings are ochreous brown with a single greyish white fascia with a yellowish tint. The hindwings are light greyish brown. Adults have been recorded on wing in late May.

References

Moths described in 1929
Dirhinosia
Insects of Turkey